White Oil Pipeline is an oil pipeline extending from Port Qasim to the Pak-Arab Refinery Company (PARCO) at Qasba Gujrat, Multan District, Punjab, Pakistan.

The White Oil Pipeline transports imported oil from Port Qasim to Pak-Arab Refinery.

The primary contractor was China Petroleum Engineering and Construction Corporation and the sub-contractor was Techno Engineering.

See also 

 List of oil refineries
 Pakistan Refinery Limited
 Khalifa Coastal Refinery
 Attock Refinery
 Pak-Arab Refinery

References

External links 
 Pak-Arab Refinery Limited

Buildings and structures in Multan
Economy of Multan
Multan District
Oil pipelines in Pakistan